Tao Zongwang is a fictional character in Water Margin, one of the Four Great Classical Novels of Chinese literature. Nicknamed "Nine Tailed Turtle", he ranks 75th among the 108 Stars of Destiny and 39th among the 72 Earthly Fiends.

Background
Born into a peasant family in Guangzhou (光州; around present-day Huangchuan County, Henan), Tao Zongwang is physically well-built. He could fight well using spear or sword. When he first appears in the book, he is the fourth-ranking chief in the bandit group at Mount Yellow Gate led by Ou Peng, Jiang Jing and Ma Lin.

Joining Liangshan
When Song Jiang is following the outlaws of Liangshan Marsh back to their stronghold after they rescued him at Jiangzhou (江州; present-day Jiujiang, Jiangxi), he comes by Mount Yellow Gate with the group. They are blocked by the four bandit chiefs, who demand to know whether Song is among them. When he steps out  to show himself, the four come forward to pay him homage. Their request to join Liangshan is welcomed by Song.

Campaigns and death
Tao Zongwang is placed in charge of construction of forts and digging of ditches at Liangshan after the 108 Stars of Destiny came together in what is called the Grand Assembly. He participates in the campaigns against the Liao invaders and rebel forces in Song territory following amnesty from Emperor Huizong for Liangshan.

Tao Zongwang is killed in the battle of Runzhou (潤州; present-day Runzhou District, Zhenjiang, Jiangsu) in the campaign against Fang La.

References
 
 
 
 
 
 
 

72 Earthly Fiends
Fictional farmers
Fictional characters from Henan